Thomas Byron Courtney (born 2 July 1989), known professionally as Tom Zanetti, is a British DJ, music producer, rapper and singer. He is best known for his songs "Darlin’" (2015) and "You Want Me" (2016), both of which received silver and platinum BPI certifications respectively. The latter of the two charted in the United Kingdom, Belgium and Republic of Ireland.

Music career

Zanetti started his musical career performing in clubs at age 17.

These days, he is best known for his songs "Darlin’" (2015) and "You Want Me" (2016), both of which received silver and platinum BPI certifications respectively. The latter of the two charted in the United Kingdom, Belgium and Ireland.

Television career
In January 2021, Zanetti took part in the tenth season of Celebs Go Dating, titled “Celebs Go Dating: The Mansion” along with Joey Essex, Curtis Pritchard, Chloe Ferry and others. The usual series was tweaked to allow the production of the show to take place amid the COVID-19 pandemic in the United Kingdom. Eight famous faces were placed in a house, in order to get to know eight further members of the public, go on dates and start new relationships with the guidance of dating agents and psychologists.

Zanetti chose to break the rules and date fellow celebrity, Made In Chelsea star, Sophie Hermann. They dated throughout the series and left the series as a couple.

Boxing career 
Zanetti was scheduled to make his boxing debut on 15 October 2022 at the Sheffield Arena. His first opponent, Jack Bean, withdrew due to his mental health. His second opponent, Jayden King, withdrew after realizing that he will not be able to make weight only a few hours after the heated press conference where both charged towards each other numerous times. Co-owner of Misfits Boxing Mams Taylor ensured on Twitter that Zanetti will have a presence on a future Misfits Boxing event and that King will be banned from any future events following his withdrawal. On 14 October it was announced that Zanetti had signed a 3 fight deal with Misfits Boxing following his removal after King withdrew.

Albaher vs Zanetti 
On 1 December it was announced that Zanetti will face Slim Albaher on 14 January 2023 at Wembley Arena in London, England for the MF light heavyweight title. Albaher defeated Zanetti via unanimous decision.

Khattri vs Zanetti 
On 14 February 2023, it was announced that Zanetti had signed a multi fight deal with Kingpyn Boxing to compete in the High Stakes Tournament. On March 12 at the Kingpyn Launch Party, Zanetti was matched up with Jarvis Khattri	for the quarter final of the Kingpyn High Stakes Tournament at Wembley Arena in London on 22 April.

Personal life
Zanetti attended Royds School in Rothwell, West Yorkshire from which he was expelled: subsequently he attended Tinshill Learning Centre until age 16.  He has one son, Deaconn,  born in 2006 when he was 17, who has made an appearance in one of his music videos.

Zanetti's girlfriend, Lizzie, died in a car accident in August 2010.

Years later, Zanetti was known for having extra-marital relations with Katie Price in 2015. He later dated Made in Chelsea star Sophie Hermann.

Zanetti is a supporter of Leeds United F.C.

Filmography

Discography

Singles

Music videos

Boxing record

Exhibition

References

Living people
1989 births
21st-century British businesspeople
Bassline musicians
English house musicians
English male rappers
English record producers
Musicians from Leeds
People from Belle Isle, Leeds
Electronic dance music DJs
YouTube boxers